Massive is a sitcom broadcast on digital channel BBC Three. It is set in Manchester and stars Ralf Little and Carl Rice as Danny and Shay, who leave their office jobs to set up a record label when Danny inherits £10,000 following the death of his grandmother.
The series began airing on BBC Three on 14 September 2008.

Cast and characters
 Danny Stewart: (Ralf Little), best friend to Shay, it is his money that allows them to set up Shady Music.  He gets on well with Shay although on many occasions has many disagreements with him about his style of music.  He has also found himself in an unwanted relationship with Tina.  Danny drives an Austin Allegro.
 Shay Finnegan: (Carl Rice), real name Seamus. Son of Tony and Lorraine, he is the first of his family to find gainful employment. He also has unusual interests in music, mainly from an interest in "The Lamps" and trying to resurrect old music styles.  He does not like HearKittyKitty but soon grows fond of them as they become more successful.
 Lou: (Christine Bottomley), local music critic and journalist.
 Tony Finnegan: (Johnny Vegas), petty thief, father of Shay.
 Lorraine Finnegan: (Lorraine Cheshire), mother of Shay, she is fond of drinking alcohol, especially Strongbow cider.
Nancy: (Joanne King), young lady who works in the cafe, a friend of Danny's and love interest of Swing.
 Swing: (Joel Fry), geeky friend of Danny and Shay, he DJs in his spare time. Works in an electrical store and lives with his mother. The series sees him pursuing his relationship with Nancy
 Tina Simpson: (Beverly Rudd), one half of HearKittyKitty.  Sister to Marie and at pains to tell everyone she meets that she is not adopted.  She likes drinking Lambrini perry and has a love interest with Danny.
 Marie Simpson: (Faye McKeever), the other half of HearKittyKitty.  She likes eating pies. She and her sister both work in Superb'Uns, a baker's shop.
 Manny Westside: (Paul Kaye), recovering cocaine addict, record producer and DJ.
 Tommy Sadoski: (Nigel Whitmey), American Anglophile and lawyer with a penchant for pork pies.
 Ricky Lisburg: (Steve Furst), Washed up A&R scout. He needs to make a successful signing soon and is willing to try anything to get HearKittyKitty to jump to his label – he is not beyond pretending to be a reporter or acting camp to get what he needs. His reading material consists of Self Help Books.
 The Pott Shrigleys: (Peter and the Wolf (UK band)) The Hebden Bridge five-piece who feature in Episode 6 of the series. The title music, 'Make It Alone,' and 'White Noise' are the 2 songs played by the band, with the latter being the single song showcased at the Hebden Bridge gig.
 The Lamps: (a.P.A.t.T. (UK band)) The Hebden Bridge six-piece who feature in Episode 1/2 of the series. "The band perform in masks and write songs about Jeremy Paxman  – they're never going to sell any records." Two songs were composed by a.P.A.t.T. for the show "Dogs Ablaze" and "Oo La La Jeremy Paxman"

The programme was produced by Jim Poyser and directed by David Kerr.

Episode list

External links

BBC – Massive Press Release

BBC television sitcoms
Television shows set in Manchester
2008 British television series debuts
2008 British television series endings
2000s British sitcoms
2000s British teen sitcoms
BBC high definition shows
British comedy television shows
English-language television shows